Edmund Weaver was a draper and a bookseller in London in the 17th century.

Life
Edmund Weaver was an apprentice to Thomas Wight and was 'clothed' in 1607 and became master of the Worshipful Company of Drapers in 1637. He was married to Jane Weaver, who died on 29 August 1636. He was appointed a Commissioner of Hereford by an act of parliament in 1648.

Weaver had many important books printed so he could sell them in his shop near St Paul's Church in London. He published Robert Cawdrey's book, A Table Alphabeticall in 1604.  was the first monolingual dictionary in the English language.

Other books published
. Robert Bolton, Batchelour in Divinitie, and Minister of Gods Word at Broughton in Northampton Shire. The sixth Edition, corrected and amended, with a Table thereunto annexed. At London, Imprinted by Iohn Legatt, for Edmund Weaver, and are to be sold at his Shop at the great North doore of Pauls Church. 1636.
 , Thomas Morton, Printed [by R. Field] for Edmund Weaver, London, 1609
, Richard Bernard, 55pp. London: by Felix Kyngston, and are to be sold by Edmund Weaver, 1624.
 , John Cotta, Imprinted at London : By William Iones, and are to be sold by Edmund [Weaver] at the great North doore of S. Pauls Church, 1617.
:
'
But joy came in the morning.'
',
.'
'These come too late, though they import they love,
.'
Printed at London by John Windet for Edmund Weaver, and are to be solde at the Great North doore of Paules, 1604. Small 4to.

Notes

External links
A  description of Robert Cawdrey from the University of Toronto library

British book publishers (people)
16th-century English businesspeople
1590s births
Year of death missing
Bookshops in London
English booksellers